This article refers to sports broadcasting contracts in Israel. For a list of rights in other countries, see Sports television broadcast contracts.

Football
Israeli Premier League: Sport 1, Sport 5
Israel State Cup: Sport 5
Toto Cup: Sport 5
UEFA Champions League: Sport 5 
UEFA Europa League: Sport 1
Premier League: Sport 1
EFL Championship: Sport 1
EFL League One: Sport 1
EFL League Two: Sport 1
La Liga:ONE
Italian Serie A: ONE 2
Bundesliga: Sport 1
Eredivisie: Sport 1
Ekstraklasa: Sport 5
Nemzeti Bajnokság I: Eurosport
Brazilian League: Sport 1
Major League Soccer: Sport 1
AFC Champions League: Sport 1
AFC Cup: Sport 1
Copa Libertadores: Sport 1
Copa Sudamericana: Sport 1
Recopa Sudamericana: Sport 1
Argentine Primera División:  Sport 1
Australian Football League: ONE
Austrian Bundesliga: Sport 5
Belgian First Division A: Sport 1
Turkish Super League: Sport 1
2022 FIFA World Cup qualification (CONMEBOL) : Sport 1

Basketball
NBA: Sport 5 (and sub channels)
Israeli basketball league: Sport 5
Euroleague: Israel 10, Sport +5 LIVE

Boxing
Dream Boxing: DAZN: October 2022 to October 2025, all fights

Kickboxing
King of Kings: DAZN: October 2022 to October 2025, all fights

Mixed Martial Arts
Bushido MMA: DAZN: October 2022 to October 2025, all fights

Multi-discipline events
Summer Olympics: Eurosport (2020)
Summer Olympics: Eurosport (2024)
Winter Olympics: Eurosport (2018)
Winter Olympics: Eurosport (2022)
Olympic Games: Eurosport, sport 5

Motor racing
Formula One: Sport +5 LIVE

Tennis
Australian Open: Eurosport
US Open: Eurosport
Wimbledon: Sport 5 (and sub channels)
ATP tournaments and WTA tournaments: Eurosport

Israel
Sports television in Israel